Daniel John Bongino (born December 4, 1974) is an American conservative political commentator, radio show host, and author. He served as a New York City Police Department (NYPD) officer from 1995 to 1999 and as a Secret Service agent from 1999 to 2011. Bongino ran for Congress unsuccessfully as a Republican three times. He currently hosts the syndicated conservative talk radio show The Dan Bongino Show on Westwood One and Unfiltered with Dan Bongino on Fox News.

Early life and education
Bongino was born and raised in Queens, New York City. He is of half-Italian descent.

He attended Queens College in the city, where he earned both a bachelor's degree and master's degree in psychology, and Pennsylvania State University, where he earned a Master of Business Administration.

Career

NYPD 
Bongino worked for the New York City Police Department from 1995 to 1999.

Secret Service and book publication 
Bongino joined the United States Secret Service in 1999 as a special agent, leaving the New York Field Office in 2002 to become an instructor at the Secret Service Training Academy in Beltsville, Maryland. In 2006, he was assigned to the Presidential Protection Division during George W. Bush's second term. He remained on protective duty after Barack Obama became president, leaving in May 2011 to run for the U.S. Senate.

Bongino's first book, Life Inside the Bubble, about his career as a Secret Service agent, was published in 2013. The book discusses his experiences protecting presidents George W. Bush and Barack Obama and investigating federal crimes along with his 2012 run for the U.S. Senate in Maryland.

Bongino was criticized by former colleagues at the Secret Service for using his Secret Service background as part of his run for political office and for his claim of having secret information based on conversations he overheard in the Obama White House. A former colleague criticized him for trying to use his proximity to President Barack Obama in his political career: "He's trying to draw attention to himself and he's hijacking the Secret Service brand. That's all he's got going for him." Bongino said he had access to "high-level discussions" in the White House. Unnamed former colleagues said he "tends to exaggerate his importance on the presidential detail and exaggerate his proximity" and that "We don't sit in on meetings at the White House. We don't sit in on high-level meetings." In response to the criticism from an anonymous former colleague, Bongino said, "There's nothing confidential in the book" and "It's not a tell-all. It's my tale of the Secret Service." He rejected Birtherism, the claim that President Obama was born outside the United States.

His second book, The Fight: A Secret Service Agent's Inside Account of Security Failings and the Political Machine was published in January 2016.

Media 

Bongino has been a radio host and commentator on local and national radio programs. He has been a guest host for both the Sean Hannity and Mark Levin radio shows and sometimes fills in on WMAL-FM talk radio in Washington, D.C. and WBAL in Baltimore. He was a paid contributor to NRATV until December 2018.

He has frequently appeared on Fox News' opinion programming and on the conspiracy theory website InfoWars. He guest hosted Hannity's Fox News show in December 2018.

Bongino is a proponent of Spygate, a conspiracy theory alleging illegal spying on Donald Trump's 2016 campaign was perpetrated by Barack Obama's administration, and published a book on the subject titled Spygate: The Attempted Sabotage of Donald J. Trump.

In December 2019, Bongino launched the website Bongino Report as an alternative to the conservative Drudge Report website. Prior to the site's launch, he criticized Drudge Report founder Matt Drudge for having "abandoned" Trump supporters.

Politico reported in October 2020 that Bongino's posts on Facebook were routinely among the most shared on the platform.

In November 2020, The New York Times listed Dan Bongino in its top 5 election "misinformation superspreaders".

In the wake of the Capitol riots, Bongino's Twitter account was temporarily shut down on January 7, 2021, for violating Twitter's Civic Integrity policy.

In March 2021, Cumulus Media signed Bongino to replace The Rush Limbaugh Show on its talk radio stations. Cumulus already carried Bongino's existing one-hour podcast. In May, Fox News announced it had signed Bongino to host a new weekend program, Unfiltered With Dan Bongino, starting on June 5. Between July and August 2021, Bongino hosted Canceled in the USA, a five-part series on cancel culture for Fox Nation, featuring interviews with people who have been "canceled" due to their opinions or beliefs. Bongino's show draws an estimated 8.5 million listeners according to October 2021 estimates from Talkers Magazine, a talk radio trade magazine; among the numerous shows competing to succeed Limbaugh, it ranked second, behind Premiere Networks' designated successor to Limbaugh, The Clay Travis and Buck Sexton Show.

In January 2022, Bongino was permanently banned from YouTube for using his main account in an attempt to circumvent a temporary suspension imposed on his secondary account after he had posted a video questioning the efficacy of masks against COVID-19.

On December 11, 2022, Bongino announced plans to end of his Cumulus radio show at the end of his contract 18 months in the future.

Conflict over COVID-19 vaccine mandates 
On October 19, 2021, Bongino declared himself against corporate vaccine mandates, even though he was vaccinated. He called on his employer, Cumulus Media, to end their vaccine mandate, which had been announced in September. Unvaccinated employees at Cumulus had already been let go on October 11 and replaced. "You can have me or the mandate. But you can't have both of us," Bongino said on his show. After taking nearly 2 weeks off, he returned to announce he was "negotiating" his ultimatum with Cumulus, starting a fund for fired employees of Cumulus.

Brian Rosenwald, a talk radio historian, believed Bongino's request was never much of an ultimatum, seeing little reason for Cumulus or its host to sever ties. Rosenwald commented:

In a December 2021 interview with The New Yorker, Bongino stated that he had been vaccinated for COVID-19, at the advice of his doctor due to his lymphoma.

Investing 
Bongino publicly announced in June 2020 that he had purchased an "ownership stake" of unspecified value in Parler, an alternative social media platform popular among Trump supporters, conservatives, and the far-right.

Political views 
In 2018, Bongino said, "My entire life right now is about owning the libs. That's it." He is a supporter of former president Donald Trump.

Bongino has called the investigation of possible Trump-Russia collusion a "total scam", and is a proponent of the Spygate conspiracy theory. In May 2018, he was quoted by Trump in a tweet, as saying that former CIA Director John Brennan "has disgraced the entire Intelligence Community. He is the one man who is largely responsible for the destruction of American's faith in the Intelligence Community and in some people at the top of the FBI." Bongino was also quoted as alleging that Brennan was "worried about staying out of jail".

In May 2018, after Republican Congressman Trey Gowdy and some conservative legal experts challenged Trump's claims that the FBI had spied on his 2016 presidential campaign, Bongino claimed Gowdy had been "fooled" by the Department of Justice. In February 2019, he accused Deputy Attorney General Rod Rosenstein of attempting a coup against Trump.

According to Mother Jones, Bongino is a member of Groundswell, a group of conservative activists working to advance conservative causes.

In 2019, Bongino published Exonerated: The Failed Takedown of President Donald Trump by the Swamp. It was on The New York Times Best Seller list with a dagger (the NYT Bestseller list version of an asterisk) indicating the book benefitted from bulk sales. In August 2020, he denied that his book benefited from bulk sales, maintaining the only event at which books were bought in bulk took place over a month after his book appeared on the list.

Bongino reportedly told the House Judiciary Committee during hearings on police brutality that efforts to reduce the funding of police departments were an "abomination" that should be dropped "before someone gets hurt".

During the 2020 election, he promoted false and baseless claims of voter fraud. After Joe Biden won the 2020 election and Donald Trump refused to concede, Bongino backed Trump's claims of election fraud, and falsely claimed that the Democrats rigged the election.

Bongino has been a strong critic of face mask mandates during the COVID-19 pandemic, falsely claiming that face masks are "largely ineffective", and deriding them as "face diapers" on occasion.

Political campaigns

2012 U.S. Senate election 

Bongino ran unsuccessfully for the U.S. Senate in Maryland in 2012. Former gubernatorial candidate Brian Murphy was his campaign chairman. Bongino won the Republican primary on April 3, 2012, with 33.8 percent of the vote, defeating nine other candidates. He finished second with 26.6% of the vote against incumbent Democrat Ben Cardin.

2014 House of Representatives election 

Bongino ran for the U.S. House of Representatives seat from Maryland's 6th Congressional District in the 2014 election against incumbent Democrat John Delaney. Bongino lost to Delaney by 1.5 percentage points. While Bongino carried four of the district's five counties, he could not overcome a 20,500-vote deficit in the district's share of Montgomery County in the outer suburbs of Washington.

2016 House of Representatives election 

After moving to Florida in 2015, Bongino contemplated running for the United States Senate and Florida's 18th congressional district in 2016. However, in June 2016, Bongino declared that he would seek the Republican nomination for Florida's 19th congressional district. He faced Chauncey Goss, a Sanibel City Councilman who sought the seat in 2012, and Francis Rooney, a businessman and former United States Ambassador to the Holy See, in the primary.

In an August 2016 interview with a Politico reporter, Bongino went on a profanity-laced rant against the reporter, who asked about a story in the Naples Daily News that Bongino said was dishonest. The recorded phone call was published by Politico. He placed third in the August 2016 primary, losing the nomination to Rooney.

Personal life 
Bongino is married to Paula Andrea, née Martinez, who was born in Colombia. They have two daughters. In 2012, he and his wife operated three businesses from their home, selling martial arts apparel, designing websites, and consulting on security and risk management. While running for office in 2016, Bongino resisted talking about his business interests and said he and his wife had shut them down.

Having lived in Severna Park, Maryland, since 2002, Bongino moved to Palm City, Florida, in 2015.

Cancer diagnosis 

On September 23, 2020, Bongino announced that a seven-centimeter tumor had been found in his throat. He added that he was unsure if the tumor was cancerous or benign, but would fly to New York on September 25 for further screening. On October 2, he said that he had received a "bad phone call" from doctors, and announced that he would be undergoing surgery on October 7.

Following his surgery, he tweeted that the "entire tumor" was removed from his neck, but that he likely had lymphoma. He said he would receive treatment in the future. On October 16, he confirmed that he received an official diagnosis of Hodgkin's lymphoma, adding that he would be continuing treatment in consultation with his doctors. In an interview in July 2021, Bongino announced that he had "beaten" cancer.

Electoral history

Publications

References

External links 

 
 
 
 
 Evan Osnos: Dan Bongino and the Big Business of Returning Trump to Power. In: The New Yorker, December 27, 2021.

1974 births
21st-century American male writers
American male non-fiction writers
21st-century American memoirists
American writers of Italian descent
American political commentators
American YouTubers
Archbishop Molloy High School alumni
Candidates in the 2012 United States elections
Candidates in the 2014 United States elections
Candidates in the 2016 United States elections
Critics of Islamism
Florida Republicans
Fox News people
Living people
Maryland Republicans
People from Palm City, Florida
People from Severna Park, Maryland
Politicians from New York City
Queens College, City University of New York alumni
Smeal College of Business alumni
United States Secret Service agents
Writers from Florida
Writers from Maryland
Writers from Queens, New York